The 2003 North Somerset Council election took place on 1 May 2003 to elect members of North Somerset Unitary Council in Somerset, England. The whole council was up for election and the Conservative Party lost overall control of the council to no overall control.

Election result

Ward results

References

2003 English local elections
2003
2000s in Somerset